Albert John "Allan" Watkins (21 April 1922 – 3 August 2011) was a Welsh cricketer, who played for England in fifteen Tests from 1948 to 1952.

Life and career
Born in Usk, Monmouthshire, Allan Watkins made his debut for Glamorgan just three weeks after his seventeenth birthday in 1939, as World War II loomed. He served in the war as a firefighter in the Royal Navy.

He was an all-rounder: a left-handed batsman, a medium to fast-medium left-arm bowler and a brilliant close fielder, particularly at short leg. He was the first Glamorgan cricketer to score a century in Tests for England, and played for the county until 1961, when he was 39 years old and struggling with asthma.

Watkins toured South Africa in 1948-49 and India and Pakistan in 1951-52 with the English Test team, and also participated in the 1955-56 'A' Tour to Pakistan. In 1953–54, he played with the Commonwealth XI in India, returning home early through injury.

He was voted Indian Cricket Cricketer of the Year after a successful Test series there in 1951–52.  During that series Watkins battled his way to a nine-hour-long, unbeaten 137, in Delhi, his best Test score. Watkins' best Test performances were overseas, as his five home Tests did not provide a single innings above fifty. His other Test century came in the Fourth Test at Johannesburg in 1948–49, when he made 111.

Watkins scored 1000 runs in an English season 13 times, and also took 100 wickets in 1954 and 1955, thus achieving the double in those two seasons.

He also played football for Cardiff City and Plymouth Argyle, and Rugby union for Pontypool. He played Minor Counties cricket for Suffolk in 1965 and 1966.

Watkins went on to successfully coach school cricket, most notably at Oundle School and Framlingham College. He died in Kidderminster, Worcestershire, on 3 August 2011, following a short illness.

References

External links
 
 Allan Watkins at CricketArchive

1922 births
2011 deaths
England Test cricketers
Welsh cricketers
Glamorgan cricketers
Royal Navy personnel of World War II
Marylebone Cricket Club cricketers
Players cricketers
North v South cricketers
Commonwealth XI cricketers
Suffolk cricketers
Welsh cricket coaches
People from Usk
Cricketers from Monmouthshire
Welsh footballers
Pontypool RFC players
Cardiff City F.C. players
Plymouth Argyle F.C. players
English Football League players
Association football wing halves
Royal Navy sailors